Kharotabad or Kili Khezi is a neighborhood of Quetta, Balochistan, Pakistan.

Kharotabad Incident 
The Kharotabad Incident refers to the deaths of four Russians and one Tajik citizen at a Frontier Corps (FC) checkpoint in Kharotabad in May 2011. They were shot on the basis of reports that they were suicide bombers. A police surgeon who testified against the official account was later also claimed to be shot dead.

The Kharotabad Commission Report is a compiled judicial inquiry papers covering the prelude and causes of the police raid in Kharotabad area of Quetta, Balochistan province of Pakistan on 18 May 2011.

See also 
 Kharotabad Incident
 Kharotabad Commission Report

References 

Populated places in Quetta District